Gymnocalycium ragonesei is a species of Gymnocalycium from Argentina.

References

External links
 
 

ragonesei
Flora of Argentina